Beita may refer to:

Beita, Nablus, Palestinian town in the Nablus Governorate, West Bank
Beita incident, killings that took place in Beita, Nablus
Steven Beitashour, Iranian footballer

China
Beita District (北塔区), Shaoyang, Hunan
Beita Subdistrict, Chaoyang, Liaoning (北塔街道), in Shuangta District
Beita Subdistrict, Shenyang (北塔街道), in Huanggu District, Shenyang, Liaoning
 Beita station, in Huanggu District, Shenyang